Gaslyn Lake is a  lake located in Burnett County, Wisconsin. It has a maximum depth of 12 feet. Visitors have access to the lake from a public boat landing. Fish include panfish, largemouth bass and northern pike.

References

Bodies of water of Burnett County, Wisconsin
Lakes of Wisconsin